The 1987 Harlow District Council election took place on 7 May 1987 to elect members of Harlow District Council in Essex, England. This was on the same day as other local elections. The Labour Party retained control of the council.

Election result

All comparisons in vote share are to the corresponding 1983 election.

Ward results

Brays Grove

Great Parndon

Katherines With Sumner

Kingsmoor

Latton Bush

Little Parndon

Mark Hall North

Mark Hall South

Netteswell East

Old Harlow

Passmores

Potter Street

Stewards

Tye Green

References

1987
1987 English local elections
1980s in Essex